The Faroese records in swimming are ratified by the Faroese Swimming Federation: Svimjisamband Føroya (SSF).

Long course (50 m)

Men

Women

Mixed relay

Short course (25 m)

Men

Women

Mixed relay

References
General
 Faroese Long Course Records 14 December 2022 updated
 Faroese Short Course Records 14 December 2022 updated
Specific

External links 
 SSF web site
 Faroe Islands Records swimrankings.net 14 December 2022 updated

Faroe Islands
Records
Swimming
Swimming